Guillermo Martínez Nolasco (born 21 August 1939) is a Mexican retired general and politician affiliated with the Institutional Revolutionary Party. As of 2014 he served as Deputy of the LIX Legislature of the Mexican Congress as a plurinominal representative.

References

1939 births
Living people
Politicians from Sinaloa
People from Mazatlán
Mexican military personnel
Members of the Chamber of Deputies (Mexico)
Institutional Revolutionary Party politicians
21st-century Mexican politicians
Deputies of the LIX Legislature of Mexico